Codium taylorii is a species of seaweed in the Codiaceae family.

In Western Australia is found along the coast in the Kimberley and Gascoyne regions. It is found in many other tropical waters.

References

taylorii
Plants described in 1960